The Great Mosque of Cirebon, officially known as Masjid Agung Sang Cipta Rasa, is one of the oldest mosques in Indonesia. The mosque is located in the west side of the field opposite the Kraton Kasepuhan, Cirebon, Indonesia. It has a tiered roof and is similar in style to the Agung Mosque in Banten.

References

Buildings and structures in Cirebon
Mosques in Indonesia
Religious buildings and structures in West Java
Cultural Properties of Indonesia in West Java
Cirebon